Shir Ali Khan (also Romanized as Shīr ‘Alī Khān; also known as Shīr ‘Alī) is a village in Jahanabad Rural District, in the Central District of Hirmand County, Sistan and Baluchestan Province, Iran. At the 2006 census, its population was 61, in 16 families.

References 

Populated places in Hirmand County